Luster is a 2020 debut novel by Raven Leilani. It follows a young Black woman who gets involved with a middle-aged white man in an open marriage. Luster was released on August 4, 2020 by Farrar, Straus and Giroux. It received mainly positive critical reception and won the 2020 Kirkus Prize for fiction. In December 2020, the novel was found in Literary Hub to have made 16 lists of the year's best books.

Plot 
Luster follows Edie, a Black woman in her twenties who lives in New York City and works as an editorial assistant. She meets Eric, a white man in his forties who is in an open marriage. Eric and his wife have a 12-year-old adoptive daughter, Akila, who is also Black. Edie begins a sexual relationship with Eric and moves to New Jersey to live with his family after she gets fired.

Major themes 
Critics noted that the character of Edie is a flâneur, which is notable as it is typically a literary position occupied by white male characters.

Critical reception 
The book was recommended by various outlets prior to its publication.

Luster received mostly positive reviews. Kirkus Reviews described the book in a starred review as "Sharp, strange, propellant—and a whole lot of fun." Mark Athitakis rated the book 3.5/4 stars and stated in USA Today, "Luster isn’t just a sardonic book, but a powerful one about emotional transformation."  Publishers Weekly reviewed the book and stated, "Edie’s ability to navigate the complicated relationships with the Walkers exhibits Leilani’s mastery of nuance, and the narration is perceptive, funny, and emotionally charged." Bookpage.com gave Luster a starred review and wrote: "Leilani’s writing is cerebral and raw, and this debut novel will establish her as a powerful new voice."

Noting that the novel is a debut, Leah Greenblatt of EW wrote, "that newness sometimes shows; after a wildly beguiling start, the novel telescopes inward, often forsaking narrative momentum for mood and color. Sentence by sentence, though, she’s also a phenomenal writer, her dense, dazzling paragraphs shot through with self-effacing wit and psychological insight." Writing for Virginia Quarterly Review, Kaitlyn Greenidge praised Leilani's "linguistic skill."

Publication 
 2020, United States, Farrar, Straus and Giroux , Publication date 4 August 2020, hardcover.

Adaptation 
In October 2021, it was reported that a television series adaptation of the novel was in development at HBO. The project will be produced by Gaumont International Television and Tessa Thompson's Viva Maude with Thompson and Kishori Rajan executive producing.

Awards and nominations 
 Winner, 2020 Kirkus Prize for Fiction
 Winner, 2020 Center for Fiction First Novel Prize
Winner, 2020 National Book Critics Circle Award for Fiction
 Longlist, 2021 Andrew Carnegie Medal for Excellence in Fiction

References

External links 
 Luster on Us.macmillan.com

2020 American novels
English-language novels
2020 debut novels
Novels set in New York City
African-American literature
Literature by African-American women
Novels set in New Jersey
Farrar, Straus and Giroux books
Kirkus Prize-winning works
First-person narrative novels